Kevin Cooke (born February 1, 1980) is an American politician. He served as a member of the Georgia House of Representatives from the 18th District from 2011-2021. Cooke sponsored 125 bills. He is a member of the Republican Party.

References

Republican Party members of the Georgia House of Representatives
21st-century American politicians
Living people
1980 births
Candidates in the 2020 United States elections